Nicholas East House is a historic home located in West Vincent Township, Chester County, Pennsylvania.  The original section was built in 1820, and is a -story, five-bay by two-bay, random fieldstone structure. It has a gable roof and gable end chimneys.  It has a two-story rear addition, with a one-story addition attached to it.  The front facade features a full-width porch.

It was added to the National Register of Historic Places in 1973.

References

Houses on the National Register of Historic Places in Pennsylvania
Houses completed in 1820
Houses in Chester County, Pennsylvania
National Register of Historic Places in Chester County, Pennsylvania